The May Bumps 2015 were a set of rowing races at Cambridge University from Wednesday 10 June 2015 to Saturday 13 June 2015. The event was run as a bumps race and was the 124th set of races in the series of May Bumps which have been held annually in mid-June in this form since 1887.

Head of the River crews
  rowed over on all four days to retain the headship they won in 2011.

  women rowed over on all four days to retain the headship for a second year.

Highest 2nd VIIIs
  remained the highest placed men's second VIII, bumping  back on the final day after being bumped on the previous day.

  rose 5 places to remain the highest placed women's second VIII, 14th overall in the W1 division.

Links to races in other years

References

2015 in rowing
May Bumps results
2015 in English sport
June 2015 sports events in the United Kingdom